The Vinteuil Sonata is a fictional musical work described in the novel sequence In Search of Lost Time by Marcel Proust. The sonata features mainly in the section Un amour de Swann.  
The character  Charles Swann associates a musical phrase in the piece with his love for Odette de Crécy. 
It was on one of those days that [Odette] happened to play for me the passage in Vinteuil’s sonata that contained the little phrase of which Swann had been so fond. But often one hears nothing when one listens for the first time to a piece of music that is at all complicated ...

For our memory, relatively to the complexity of the impressions which it has to face while we are listening, is infinitesimal, as brief as the memory of a man who in his sleep thinks of a thousand things and at once forgets them, or as that of a man in his second childhood who cannot recall a minute afterwards what one has just said to him...

Proust was interested in music's power to trigger involuntary memory, a term which he invented. The Vinteuil Sonata is thus comparable to the celebrated episode of the madeleine earlier in the novel, which triggers memories on the part of the narrator.

The composer
In the context of the novel, the sonata is a contemporary work. The composer Vinteuil (we do not learn his first name) is one of Proust's characters. We learn that he is also the composer of a septet, and that his daughter is a lesbian.

The sonata
The Vinteuil Sonata is identifiable as a violin sonata. However, while violin sonatas are today mostly described as being for violin and piano, Proust preferred to list the instruments the other way round. However, in Proust's time the naming of a violin sonata as for "piano and violin" was, in fact, not unusual, as numerous contemporary examples demonstrate.

Possible models for the sonata
Proust was not a musician, but his description of the music is sufficiently detailed for comparisons to be made with various violin sonatas which the author is known to have heard. One relevant example is the Violin Sonata in A major by César Franck, which was written in 1886. Franck's themes reappear in different movements of the sonata which presents parallels to the Vinteuil Sonata. 
Proust took an interest in Franck and in the third part of A la recherche, Sodom et Gomorrhe, we read about his sonata for violin and piano. 

Attention has also been drawn to a sonata by the lesser-known Guillaume Lekeu, who described his work as being for piano and violin rather than violin and piano.

French musicologist Georges Kan says it could be Johannes Brahms' Violin Sonata No. 2 in A major, Op. 100. He locates "the little phrase" at bar 89 in the last movement. This passage in F sharp minor appears three times, "quasi andante", and ends the piece. When Mme. Verdurin is crying "Just as though, 'in the Ninth', he said "we need only have the Finale", or "just the overture" of The Meistersingers one naturally thinks about Beethoven or Wagner, but it should be understood as Brahms' Ninth Sonata (Op. 100 is the ninth in chronology) dubbed "Meistersinger" for its Wagnerian accents, the finale of which is reminiscent of the overture to The Meistersingers. Georges Kan specifies that "a four-hand piano arrangement was available since 1887 at Simrock and Proust could have had some information about a coming issue of Paul Klengel's piano version".

Maria and Nathalia Milstein, concert musicians and sisters, made the case in 2017 that Gabriel Pierné’s Sonata for violin and piano in D minor, Opus 36, is the model for the sonata.

Jean Santeuil
The Vinteuil Sonata has a precursor in Proust's unfinished novel Jean Santeuil, written in the 1890s, but not published until after his death. Here the musical composition is not a fictional work, but the Violin Sonata No. 1 in D minor by Camille Saint-Saëns, which was written in 1885.

"Creations" of the sonata
 Proust inspired French composer Claude Pascal in 1947 to write a sonata for violin and piano that "could have been" the sonata from Un amour de Swann.
 American composer Joseph Fennimore in 1978 wrote Swann in Love for violin and piano. Earlier, in 1976, he composed a Quartet after Vinteuil for clarinet, viola, cello and piano.
 The Chilean composer Jorge Arriagada created his version of Vinteuil's violin sonata for Raoul Ruiz's 1999 film Le Temps retrouvé (Time Regained). There is a scene where it is played in a salon.
 Korean composer Sangin Lee wrote La petite phrase de Vinteuil for clarinet, horn, violin, viola, cello, double bass in 2018. This piece was commissioned by the Festival Pablo Casals.
David Graham, Hans Werner Henze, Gerd Kuhr and	Marcel Wengler collaborated to compose their version of this sonata for the 1984 film Swann in Love.

The sonata in concert programmes and recordings
The sonata has been used as a basis on which to build concert programmes, for example a concert in Madrid at the Fundación Juan March in 2017.

Recordings
The Vinteuil Sonata
In 2017 an album of music related to Proust's work was released on the French label Mirare. Here it was suggested that the Violin Sonata Op. 36 by Gabriel Pierné could have been the model for Vinteuil's sonata.
The Proust Album
In 2021 an album was released on Warner featuring various performers including Pierre Fouchenneret (violin) and Shani Diluka (piano). A Hahn piece was labelled as the Vinteuil sonata.

References

Fictional musical works
In Search of Lost Time
Violin sonatas